The 2K11 Krug (English: 'circle') is a Soviet and now Russian medium-range, medium-to-high altitude surface-to-air missile (SAM) system. The system was designed by NPO Novator and produced by Kalinin Machine Building Plant. Its GRAU designation is "2K11." Its NATO reporting name is SA-4 Ganef, after the Yiddish word  meaning 'thief'; the name was used because the system resembled the Bristol Bloodhound.

Development and service 
Development of the Krug ZRK-SD (2K11) air defense system started in 1957 by the Lyulev OKB design bureau. It was first displayed during a parade in Moscow in May 1965. The system started to be fielded in 1967 and became fully operational in 1969. It was used by the Soviet Army as a long-range SAM.

The early version of the Krug entered service in 1965. The first operational deployment version, the Krug-A, entered service in 1967, with extensively modified versions, the Krug-M in 1971 and the Krug-M1 in 1974, which were developed to rectify problems discovered during army service. A target drone called 9M316M Virazh, developed from obsolete Krug missiles, was proposed for export in 1994.

The 2K11 was briefly operated by the Soviet army during the war in Afghanistan in 1979 and 1980, but was withdrawn several months after the initial invasion. In 1997, it was reported that, between 1993 and 1996, some 27 fire units of Krug and 349 missiles had been sold to Armenia. Poland flight tested four missiles in September 2006 against P-15 Termit (SS-N-2 'Styx') targets.

Description

Vehicles 

The TEL vehicles are tracked based on a GM-123 chassis and carry two missiles each on an elevating turntable for up to 360-degree rotation and 70-degree elevation. The two primary versions of the missile in service are the 9M8M1 (former designation 3M8M1)  (2K11M "Krug-M") and 9M8M2 (former designation 3M8M2) (2K11M2/3 "Krug-M1"), both of which are believed to be known to the US DoD as SA-4B. The original 9M8 (former designation 3M8) (SA-4A) was first introduced into service in 1965 and followed by the upgraded 9M8M (2K11A "Krug-A") in 1967 before the 9M8M1 in 1971 and the 9M8M2 in 1973. The 9M8M2 actually has a lower maximum engagement altitude and shorter range in exchange for better performance in engaging aircraft close to the battery. Each battery typically consists of two 9M8M1 missiles and four 9M8M2 missiles as well as the following radars:

 P-40 "Long Track" (1S12) E-band early warning radar (also used by the 2K12 Kub and 9K33 Osa, range 175 km/108 miles) (modified AT-Ts), in divisions command post
 1S32 "Pat Hand" H-band continuous wave fire control and guidance radar (range 128 km/80 miles)
 PRV-9 "Thin Skin" E-band height finding radar (also used by the 2K12 Kub and 9K33 Osa, range 240 km/148 miles), in regiments or brigades command post

Only "Long Track" is mounted on a modified AT-T vehicle, TEL 2P24 and "Pat Hand" 1S32 are mounted on GM-123/ GM-124.  "Thin Skin" is mounted on a truck. Batteries may also feature Ural 375D trucks 2T6 carrying spare missiles for reloading the launchers.

Missile 

The missiles are launched with the aid of four solid fuel rocket motors inside boosters attached to the outside of the missile. Once they have burned and the missile is aloft, a liquid-fuelled ramjet sustainer engine is ignited. It reaches speeds of up to Mach 4 and has an effective range of 50–55 km (31–34 miles) depending upon the version. It carries a 135 kg (300 lb) fragmentation warhead. Possible engagement altitudes range from 100 m to 27 km (330-88,500 feet). The 3M8 missile was designed and produced by NPO Novator.

Optical tracking is possible for guidance in a heavy ECM environment.

Survivability and anti-jamming capabilities 
The Krug had several features that improved the survivability of the radar against anti-radiation missiles. In PI mode (ПИ) the system only briefly illuminated the target and the computer calculated its prolonged path based on data received from early warning radars. After a longer passive period the main radar illuminated the calculated flight direction of the target for a few seconds and recalculate path of the target if necessary (if the distance between the calculated track and the actual position is greater than 7 km). As a result, the system emitted detectable signals only for a few seconds every few minutes, making it difficult to jam or launch an anti-radar missile against the Krug. The system was also able to track the target in full-passive automated PNS (ПHC) mode based on the data provided by "Long Track" mobile EWR via radio datalink. In this mode it was almost impossible to detect the Krug system until the moment of a missile launch, because the Krug did not emit radiation at all.

In 3M mode (3m aka three-point) the Krug could home on a jamming target (e.g., AN/ALQ-99). Jamming signals supposed to protect the aircraft made it into a target in this mode.

Structure of Krug missile system 

SAM-regiment have two SAM-battalions, SAM-brigade have three SAM-battalions. In each headquarter, brigade, regiment and battalion, is one command battery.
In each SAM-battalion have three SAM-batteries.

 Self-propelled launch vehicle 2P24 on GM-123 base, three in each SAM- battery
 Rocket guidance station 1S32 on GM-124 base, one in each SAM- battery
 Target detection station 1S12 on modified AT-T base, one in each command battery
 Transporter-loader vehicle 2T6 on Ural truck base, one in each SAM- battery

Variants 
 2K11A Krug A
 2K11M
 2K11M1
 M-31 Krug M – naval

Operators

Current operators 
  15
  – 12
  – 120
  – 40
  – 30

Former operators 

 
  – 30, in reserve
  had 1 brigade. Phased out in early 1990s.
 . Passed onto successor states.
  – Phased out during the 1990s
  – Phased out in 2006.
  had 1 regiment, 25. Phased out in middle 1990s.
  – 30. Phased out in 2011.
  – 500 launchers (2007) (phased out in 1990s) Missiles used as targets for training(Virazh/-M 9M316M)
 
  Phased out

Notes

External links 

 SA-4 Ganef at Global Security website
 SA-4 Ganef  at Federation of American Scientists website
 Photos of Polish Krug at Vestnik PVO website
 2K11 KRUG-M1 (SA-4B Ganef) Simulator

Cold War surface-to-air missiles of the Soviet Union
Self-propelled anti-aircraft weapons of the Soviet Union
Self-propelled anti-aircraft weapons of Russia
Science and technology in the Soviet Union
Ramjet engines
2K11
2K11
NPO Novator products
Military equipment introduced in the 1960s